Joseph Boyd may refer to:

Joseph Boyd (sailor), U.S. Navy sailor
Joseph Boyd (politician) (1835–1925), blacksmith and political figure in Newfoundland
Joseph A. Boyd Jr. (1916–2007), politician and jurist in Florida
Joseph C. Boyd (1760–1823), American soldier and politician
Joe Boyd (born 1942), American record producer and writer
Joe Boyd (American football) (1917–1997), American football player and evangelist